Jhony Alexander Peralta Cruz (born 4 November 1964) is a Peruvian politician and a former Congressman representing Piura for the 2001–2006 term and the 2006–2011 term. Peralta lost his seat in the 2011 elections when he ran for re-election, but he was not re-elected as he attained a low number of votes. Peralta belongs to the Peruvian Aprista Party.

External links

Official Congressional Site

Living people
American Popular Revolutionary Alliance politicians
Members of the Congress of the Republic of Peru
1964 births

People from Piura Region
People from Piura